Baba Moti Ram Mehra (fl. late 17th – early 18th century) was a devoted disciple and servant of the Guru Gobind Singh who, disregarding the risk to his own life, managed to enter the Thanda Burj in a very dramatic manner and serve milk to the Mata Gujri, Baba Zorawar Singh and Baba Fateh Singh, the two younger Sahibzadas (sons) of Guru Gobind Singh for three nights, where they were kept under arrest by the Mughal Governor of Sirhind, Wazir Khan. 

Moti Ram was born into a Hindu family. His parents were Bholi and Hariya Ram. His uncle was Bhai Himmat Rai Ji, a member of 1st panj pyare . On December 27, 1704, the Sahibzadas were martyred and Mata Gujri also decided to leave for heavenly abode. He arranged sandal wood for their cremation. Someone told the Nawab that his servant had served those prisoners with milk and water. The Nawab ordered the arrest of Baba Moti Ram Mehra, his mother, wife, and son. He did not conceal his act and boldly told the Nawab that it was his pious duty to serve the imprisoned children and their grandmother. Hence Baba Moti Ram Mehra, along with his family, was sentenced to death by being squeezed in a Kohlu (oil press). His sacrifice was first sermonized by Baba Banda Singh Bahadur.

Memorial Gurdwara and Gate
His followers and kin of his caste constituted the Amar Saheed Baba Moti Ram Mehra Charitable Trust. A Gurdwara known as the Memorial Baba Moti Ram Mehra stands opposite Rauza Sharif  from Gurdwara Fatehgarh Sahib, which was constructed by the Trust at the place where Moti Ram Mehra was martyred by the Nawab. The land was donated by Shiromani Gurdwara Prabandhak Committee.

Today, Moti Ram Mehra is deeply respected by Sikhs while the Baba Moti Ram Mehra Memorial Gate was constructed by the Punjab Government in remembrance of his great sacrifices.

See also
Saka Sirhind
Shaheedi Jor Mela
Diwan Todar Mal

References

18th-century Indian people